Lacoste is a French apparel company. Lacoste (or LaCoste) may also refer to:

People
 Alexandre Lacoste (1842–1923), Canadian politician
 Amélie Lacoste (born 1988), Canadian figure skater
 Carlos Lacoste (1929–2004), Argentine president
 Catherine Lacoste (born 1945), French golfer
 Jean-Pascal Lacoste, French singer, actor and TV host
 Jean de Lacoste  (1730–1820), lawyer in the parliament of Bordeaux 
 Jean-Baptiste Lacoste (died 1821), lawyer
 Jean Lacoste, French-German philosopher
 Jean-Yves Lacoste, French postmodern theologian
 Louis Lacoste (1798–1878), Canadian politician
 Louis Lacoste (composer) (c. 1675 – c. 1750), French composer
 Lucien LaCoste (1908–1995), American physicist
 Paul Lacoste (academic) (1923–2009), Canadian lawyer and academic administrator
 Paul V. Lacoste (born 1974), linebacker in the Canadian Football League
 René Lacoste (1904–1996), French tennis player and founder of the apparel company Lacoste
 Robert Lacoste (1898–1989), French politician
 Yves Lacoste (born 1929), French geographer and geopolitician

Places
 Lacoste, Hérault, a commune of the Hérault département, in France
 Lacoste, Vaucluse, a commune and medieval village of the Vaucluse département, in France
 Château Grand-Puy-Lacoste, a winery in the Bordeaux region of France

Castles
 Château de Lacoste, in Lacoste, Vaucluse, France
 Château de Lacoste (Lot), in Salviac, Lot, France
 Château de La Coste (Lot), in Grézels, Lot, France

Political groupings

 Lacoste (political faction), Emmerson Mnangagwa's faction in the ZANU-PF party, Zimbabwe

See also 
 LaCoste, Texas